The Fire and Rescue Service Long Service and Good Conduct Medal was established in June 1954 as a long service medal awarded to members of fire and rescue services throughout the United Kingdom, the Isle of Man and the Channel Islands. It was first designated The Fire Brigade Long Service and Good Conduct Medal and subsequently renamed in 2022 following an updated royal warrant. The medal is awarded for 20 years of good and efficient service.

Appearance

The Award is in cupronickel, in the form of a circular Medal, bearing on the obverse the Crown Effigy of the Sovereign and on the reverse the inscription "For Exemplary Fire and Rescue Service" with a design showing two firefighters handling a hose.

The Thirty Years of Service Clasp and the Forty Years of Service Clasp are in cupronickel bearing the inscription “Long Service, Thirty Years” and “Long Service, Forty Years” respectively.

The Medal is to be worn on the left side attached by means of a suspending bar to a ribbon one and a quarter inches in width, which is in colour red, with on either side a yellow stripe on which is superimposed a narrow stripe of red. The Thirty Years of Service Clasp and the Forty Years of Service Clasp are to be attached to the ribbon.

Criteria

Eligibility
Those eligible for the Fire and Rescue Service Long Service and Good Conduct Medal are full-time and part-time members of all ranks in Local Authority Fire Services in England and Wales, the Scottish Fire and Rescue Service, the Northern Ireland Fire and Rescue Service, or Airport Fire Services. Also eligible are members of Fire Brigades of the Isle of Man and the Channel Islands, Fire Service members of CFRA and of Her Majesty's Fire Service Inspectorate for Scotland and fire service instructors at central training establishments such as the Fire Service College, the Scottish Fire Services College, and the Defence Fire Training and Development Centre.

Length of service
Individuals may be awarded the medal for 20 years of continuous or aggregate service in an eligible fire brigade or service, so long as they have been very good in conduct and character.

Clasps for the medal are awarded for individuals upon completion of 30 years and 40 years service respectively.

See also
Fire Services Exemplary Service Medal, awarded to members of Canadian fire services
National Medal, awarded to members of Australian fire brigades
New Zealand Fire Brigades Long Service and Good Conduct Medal

References 

Civil awards and decorations of the United Kingdom
Fire service awards and honors
Long service medals
Fire and rescue in the United Kingdom
Awards established in 1954
1954 establishments in the United Kingdom
Long and Meritorious Service Medals of Britain and the Commonwealth